Pseudagonica nitida is a species of beetle in the family Carabidae, the only species in the genus Pseudagonica.

References

Panagaeinae